Banksia falcata, commonly known as prickly dryandra, is a species of prickly, column-shaped shrub that is endemic to Western Australia. It has serrated or pinnatipartite leaves, heads of up to 150 yellow flowers and soft-hairy fruit.

Description
Banksia falcata is a column-shaped shrub that typically grows to a height of  but does not form a lignotuber. The flowers are borne on a head containing between 110 and 150 flowers in each head.

Taxonomy and naming
This banksia was first formally described in 1810 by Robert Brown in the journal Transactions of the Linnean Society of London and given the name Dryandra falcata. In 2007, Austin Mast and Kevin Thiele transferred all the dryandras to the genus Banksia and this species became Banksia falcata. The specific epithet (falcata) is a Latin word meaning "falcate" or "shaped like a scythe or sickle".

Distribution and habitat
Banksia falcata grows in kwongan between the Stirling Range and Esperance in the Avon Wheatbelt, Esperance Plains, Jarrah Forest and Mallee biogeographic regions.

References

falcata
Endemic flora of Western Australia
Plants described in 1810
Taxa named by Robert Brown (botanist, born 1773)
Taxa named by Kevin Thiele